Christopher Coleman, born February 18, 1967, is an Olympic bobsledder who competed in the 1992 and 1994 Winter Olympics for the USA. He currently works as the Athlete Marketer at the United States Olympic Committee.  He is a photographer with works on display with the Art of the Olympians.

References

American male bobsledders
Bobsledders at the 1992 Winter Olympics
Bobsledders at the 1994 Winter Olympics
Olympic bobsledders of the United States
Place of birth missing (living people)
Living people
1967 births